The Schuyler–Colfax House is located at 2343 Paterson Hamburg Turnpike in Wayne, Passaic County, New Jersey, United States. The house was built in 1695 by Arent Schuyler. It was documented by the Historic American Buildings Survey in 1936. The house was added to the National Register of Historic Places on April 3, 1973, for its significance in architeture.

History

Completed as a one-room farmhouse in 1695 by Arent Schuyler, the Schuyler homestead was passed to Arent Schuyler's great granddaughter Hester Schuyler who married William Colfax, commander of George Washington's Life Guards. Their grandson, Schuyler Colfax, Jr., was the 17th Vice President of the United States. The Dutch Colonial style addition to the originally brick and field-stone building was added by Colfax in 1783.

Despite the 20th century alteration of the structure to add dormers in place of "belly-windows," the Schuyler–Colfax House was added to the State and National Registers of Historic Places in 1965, a decision based upon surviving historic features and the important role the Schuyler–Colfax family has played in local history.

Today, the building operates as a museum (though it is temporarily closed to the public) after having been purchased in 1994 by Wayne Township from Dr. Jane Colfax. Until then, the house had been continuously owned and lived in by the Colfax family.

See also
List of Washington's Headquarters during the Revolutionary War
List of the oldest buildings in New Jersey
National Register of Historic Places listings in Passaic County, New Jersey
Martin Berry House

References

External links
 
 
Wayne Township Parks and Recreation Department

Houses completed in 1695
Houses on the National Register of Historic Places in New Jersey
Houses in Passaic County, New Jersey
Museums in Passaic County, New Jersey
Historic house museums in New Jersey
Stone houses in New Jersey
National Register of Historic Places in Passaic County, New Jersey
Wayne, New Jersey
Schuyler family
New Jersey Register of Historic Places
Historic American Buildings Survey in New Jersey
1695 establishments in New Jersey
Schuyler family residences